= Redetermination =

Redetermination may refer to:

- Appeal, the process in which legal cases are reviewed, where parties request a formal change to an official decision, functioning as a process for both error correction and clarifying and interpreting law
- Redetermination of Chemical structure
